Khalid Khan is the name of:

 Khalid Khan (Hong Kong cricketer) (born 1971), Hong Kong cricketer
 Khalid Khan (politician), Pakistani politician
 Khalid Amir Khan (1934–2020), Pakistani diplomat and politician
 Khalid Jawed Khan, Pakistani lawyer, Attorney General of Pakistan
 Khalid Khan, Pakistani bassist in alternative rock band Aaroh

See also
Khaled Khan (1958–2013), for the Bangladeshi actor